The Alliance of Motion Picture and Television Producers (AMPTP) is a trade association based in Sherman Oaks, California, that represents over 350 American television and film production companies in collective bargaining negotiations with entertainment industry trade unions that include, among others, SAG-AFTRA, the Directors Guild of America, the Writers Guild of America, West, the Writers Guild of America, East, the American Federation of Musicians, and the International Alliance of Theatrical Stage Employees.

Overview 
As the entertainment industry's official collective bargaining representative, the AMPTP, like the Motion Picture Association of America (MPAA), is a key trade association for major film and television producers in the United States.  The AMPTP currently negotiates 80 industry-wide collective bargaining agreements on behalf of over 350 motion picture and television producers.  AMPTP member companies include the major motion picture studios (including Paramount Pictures, Sony Pictures, Universal Pictures, Walt Disney Studios and Warner Bros.), the principal broadcast television networks (including ABC, CBS, FOX and NBC), streaming services like Netflix, Apple TV+, & Amazon, certain cable television networks, and other independent film and television production companies.

History 
The AMPTP was founded in 1924 as the Association of Motion Picture Producers, or AMPP. It merged with the Alliance of Television Film Producers in 1964 and was renamed the Association of Motion Picture and Television Producers. In 1966, it also merged with the Society of Independent Producers (formed 1964). In September 1975, Universal quit the Association during craft negotiations and United Artists and Walt Disney Productions also notified the Association of their intention to withdraw the following month. Paramount and Universal formed a new organization, the Alliance. In 1982, the Alliance and AMPTP merged to form the Alliance of Motion Picture and Television Producers.

The AMPTP was an affiliate of the MPAA and Jack Valenti was president of both organisations. Nick Counter was president of the AMPTP from 1982 until March 2009.

Other former presidents and chairmen have included Joseph Schenck, Lew Wasserman, Sid Sheinberg, Y. Frank Freeman and Richard Jencks.

 the current president of the group is Carol Lombardini.

Post Production Guild 
In 2022, post-production workers in New York City, represented by Communications Workers of America (CWA) using the name The Post Production Guild, signed union cards and asked AMPTP for voluntary union recognition. AMPTP declined to voluntarily recognize the union, saying they support "a secret ballot election process by which a union can become certified as the collective bargaining representative of employees". The CWA referred to AMPTP as "anti-union", alleging the workers are "supervisors" and ineligible for representation by the National Labor Relations Board. The group filed for a union election on March 8, 2022.

See also
 2007–08 Writers Guild of America strike
 1988 Writers Guild of America strike

Notes

References

External links
 
 Association of Motion Picture and Television Producers (AMPTP) records, Margaret Herrick Library, Academy of Motion Picture Arts and Sciences
 The Motion Picture Production Code of 1930

 
 
Non-profit organizations based in Los Angeles
Organizations established in 1924
Trade associations based in the United States
Communications and media organizations based in the United States
Sherman Oaks, Los Angeles
1924 establishments in the United States